The 1942–43 Kansas Jayhawks men's basketball team represented the University of Kansas during the 1942–43 college men's basketball season.

Roster
Otto Schnellbacher
John Buescher
Donald Blair
Robert "Bob" Fitzpatrick
Max Kissell
Paul Turner
Jack Ballard
Charles B. Black
Ray Evans
George Dick
William Brill
Armand Dixon
William Forsyth
John Short
Hoyt Baker
Harold McSpadden

Schedule

References

Kansas Jayhawks men's basketball seasons
Kansas
Kansas
Kansas